Saint-Gérard-des-Laurentides (Canada 1996 Census population 2,155) is a community in the Canadian province of Quebec. Formerly a separate parish municipality in the Le Centre-de-la-Mauricie Regional County Municipality, it has been one of the seven sectors of the city of Shawinigan since the municipal amalgamation of January 1, 2002.

Neighbourhoods in Shawinigan
Former municipalities in Quebec
Former towns in Canada
Populated places disestablished in 2002